Charles Andre Glenn (born 1967), professionally known by his stage name Afrika Islam, is an American hip hop DJ and producer. He was one of the pioneers of hip hop culture and the hip hop radio station.

He began his musical career in 1977 as a ten-year-old, joining the group Rock Steady Crew. He started as an apprentice to Afrika Bambaataa, from whom he learned the art of remixing tracks. He was responsible for the events that the Zulu Nation held during the 1970s. A few years later, he moved to Los Angeles where he began working with Ice-T, for whom he produced four gold albums, all of which were released on Sire Records. He went on to remix artists including Michael Jackson and New Order.

Afrika Islam is also known for compositions that he wrote for the Soul Sonic Force and his own group called Funk Machine. For two years he hosted the radio program Zulu Beats. In his career as a DJ, he was famous for the art of mixing on four turntables simultaneously. He worked as a DJ and MC for the Rock Steady Crew.

In 1997 he released the EP Afrika Jam, which AllMusic rated 3/5.

In Europe, he is known for his performances in duet with Westbam during big techno festivals such as Mayday and Soundtropolis. He also recorded a song from the Polish duo of DJ State Kalwi & Remi.

Notable production discography 

Albums
 1987:
 Ice-T – Rhyme Pays
 1988:
 Ice-T – Power
 Colors (soundtrack)
  - Rhyme Syndicate Comin' Through
1989:
 Ice-T – The Iceberg/Freedom of Speech... Just Watch What You Say!
 Donald D – Notorious
1991:
 Ice-T – O.G. Original Gangster

Singles
 1986:
 Afrika & The Zulu Kings – "The Beach"
 1987:
 Afrika & The Zulu Kings – "Cars"
 Ice-T – "Make It Funky"
 1988:
 Ice-T – "I'm Your Pusher"
 Ice-T – "Colors"
 Toddy Tee – "I Need a Rolex"
 1989:
 Ice-T – "Lethal Weapon"
 Ice-T – "High Rollers"
 Donald D – "F.B.I."
 Ice-T – "You Played Yourself"
 Ice-T – "Dick Tracy"
 Ice-T & Rhyme Syndicate – "What Ya Wanna Do?"
 1997:
 Tricky – "Makes Me Wanna Die"

References

External links 

1967 births
Living people
American hip hop record producers
American hip hop DJs
Musicians from New York (state)